Damar Laut is a small town in Mukim Lumut, Manjung District, Perak, Malaysia.

Manjung District
Towns in Perak